Jessica Rich  (born 21 March 1990) is an Australian snowboarder who competes internationally.
 
She represented Australia at the 2018 Winter Olympics.

References

1990 births
Living people
Australian female snowboarders 
Olympic snowboarders of Australia 
Snowboarders at the 2018 Winter Olympics 
21st-century Australian women